Sir Lumberjack is a 1926 American silent drama film directed by Harry Garson and starring Maurice 'Lefty' Flynn, Kathleen Myers and Tom Kennedy.

Cast
 Maurice 'Lefty' Flynn as William Barlow Jr. 
 Kathleen Myers as 	Bess Calhoun
 Tom Kennedy as 	Bill Blake
 Will Walling as William Barlow Sr. 
 Luke Cosgrave as John Calhoun
 Bill Nestell as Lars Hansoon
 Ray Hanford as Jason Mack
 Ray Turner as Cook

References

Bibliography
 Connelly, Robert B. The Silents: Silent Feature Films, 1910-36, Volume 40, Issue 2. December Press, 1998.
 Munden, Kenneth White. The American Film Institute Catalog of Motion Pictures Produced in the United States, Part 1. University of California Press, 1997.

External links
 

1926 films
1926 drama films
1920s English-language films
American silent feature films
Silent American drama films
American black-and-white films
Films directed by Harry Garson
Film Booking Offices of America films
1920s American films
English-language drama films